Joe Lee Johnson (September 11, 1929 – May 26, 2005) was an American professional NASCAR Grand National Series driver who won the inaugural World 600 in 1960. He was also the 1959 NASCAR Convertible Division champion. He made his last NASCAR start in 1962. He was the owner of the Cleveland Speedway in Cleveland, Tennessee. He is of no relation to Junior Johnson or Jimmie Johnson.

References

External links
 

1929 births
2005 deaths
NASCAR drivers
Sportspeople from Chattanooga, Tennessee